Noga may refer to:

Businesses
Noga Communications, an Israeli cartoon broadcasting company, see List of television channels in Israel
Noga SA, a Swiss firm led by Nessim Gaon, known for its trials with Russian authorities

People
 Noga (surname)
 Nogah, a Biblical figure, a son of David

Other uses
Noga, Israel, a moshav in the Lakhish Regional Council in Israel
SS Noga, an ocean liner

See also